Hovorbis coretus is a species of gastropods belonging to the family Planorbidae.

The species is found in Southern Africa.

References

coretus